Bukit Timah Hill, located in its namesake district of Bukit Timah, is a hill located near the geographical centre of Singapore. The hill stands at an altitude of 164 metres (538 ft) above sea level, making it the highest natural peak in the country.  The highest point in Singapore, however, is the 284 metre Guoco Tower, one of numerous buildings taller than the hill.

The summit, which features a pair of 60 m (200 ft) VHF steel lattice radio masts built in the 1960s, is accessible by several walking trails and a paved maintenance road not open to the public.  The hill is now protected as part of the Bukit Timah Nature Reserve, which has been classified as an ASEAN Heritage Park.

Climate

Bukit Timah Hill features a tropical rainforest climate (Köppen Af) and has a mix of both wet and dry seasons.

Due to its moderate elevation, the weather is much cooler than the rest of Singapore and strong winds commonly occur at the peak. The daily temperature range is between 16–31 °C (60–85 °F).

The dry season runs from April to August, during which, there is generally less rainfall and warmer temperatures. The wet season runs from September to March, during which, there is more frequent rainfall and cooler temperatures.

The average annual rainfall is 2810 mm (110.63 in). The average annual daily mean temperature is 26.4 °C (79.52 °F). The coolest month is January, where the average daily mean temperature is 25.6 °C (78.08 °F). The minimum temperature may dip below 20.8 °C (69.44 °F) during rainy days in January. The warmest month is July, with an average daily mean temperature of 28.3 °C (82.94 °F).

See also
 Bukit Timah Nature Reserve
 List of elevation extremes by country

References

Places in Singapore
Hills of Singapore
Central Region, Singapore
Bukit Timah
Highest points of countries